Tina Cecilia Elisabeth Nordlund (born 19 March 1977) is a Swedish football coach and former player, most recently an assistant coach at Umeå IK. She is one of the most well known Swedish female footballers. In November 2000, she was awarded the Diamantbollen, an annual award made to the best female player in Sweden, during the Swedish Soccer Awards, and during her speech she expressed her thoughts that women's soccer received too little media publicity. She played for Alnö IF, Sundsvalls DFF and Umeå IK. She retired from playing football aged 25 after suffering from anorexia nervosa.

In her youth years she, except for playing soccer, also practiced alpine skiing, bandy, basketball and golf.

Club career

After the 1998 season, Nordlund approached English FA Women's Premier League club Tranmere Rovers about playing for them in 1998–99. At the time she was visiting boyfriend Jesper Blomqvist, who was contracted to Manchester United.

Making her debut in a 4–0 win over champions and local rivals Everton in December 1998, Nordlund remained until 1 February 1999. She then returned to Umeå IK in order to preserve her national team place ahead of the 1999 FIFA Women's World Cup.

International career
After winning eight caps at Under 17 level and 19 Under 21 caps, Nordlund made her senior Sweden debut in a 3–1 defeat by the United States at Baylor School, Chattanooga, Tennessee, on 30 October 1997. Her 9th-minute goal against Denmark in the Semi-Final of the 2001 UEFA Women's Euro proved to be the deciding goal of the match, propelling Sweden to the Final.

Personal life
Nordlund appeared in the 2006 Swedish comedy film Offside, as a football player. She is a Lazio supporter.

She has been married to Swedish television presenter Martin Björk.

References

External links
 

1977 births
Living people
Sweden women's international footballers
Swedish women's footballers
Umeå IK players
Damallsvenskan players
Tranmere Rovers L.F.C. players
FA Women's National League players
Women's association football midfielders
1999 FIFA Women's World Cup players
Sundsvalls DFF players
Expatriate women's footballers in England
Swedish expatriate sportspeople in England
People from Sundsvall
Sportspeople from Västernorrland County